Don Seenu is a 2010 Indian Telugu-language action comedy film directed by debutant Gopichand Malineni who co-wrote the film with Kona Venkat. The film stars Ravi Teja, Srihari, Shriya Saran and Anjana Sukhani. Music has been scored by Mani Sharma. The film was released on 6 August 2010. The film's title is noted to be similar to Dubai Seenu, another Ravi Teja starrer film. The film was remade in Bengali as Badsha.

Plot
This story is all about an ambitious boy named Seenu aka Srinivasa Rao who dreams of becoming a gangster. He has always liked to be called 'Don' Seenu since childhood due to the strong influence of the Amitabh Bachchan starring Don. He grows up with just one passion – that of becoming the World's No: 1 Don. Thanks to his enterprising nature, he gains access to the cream of the city's gangsters and uses his cleverness to play off the top two – Madhapur Machiraju and Narsingh, fierce rivals – against each other. Seenu wants to join one of these dons and grow up in the ranks. He joins hands with Machiraju. In the process, he is given a task to go to Germany and win the heart of Narsing's sister whose marriage is fixed with the son of a Dubai-based crime boss Naveen Duggal. Seenu goes to Germany and wins the heart of Deepthi and later, he discovers that he was shown the wrong girl. The wrong girl is none other than Machiraju's sister. When Machiraju discovers that his henchman is the one who showed the wrong girl, Machiraju attempts to kill his henchman. Seenu manages to impress Deepthi and arrives back in India. When Deepthi and Priya confront Seenu about the confusion, Seenu reveals that his sister Lakshmi is actually Narsing's husband who was separated due to Machiraju's antics and thus wanted to prove his innocence by joining the gang. Meanwhile, Duggal calls Machiraju and Narsingh at the docks where Seenu arrives with Lakshmi and makes Machiraju prove her innocence. Narsingh apologizes to Lakshmi and they reconcile with their child. A fight ensues where Seenu defeats Duggal and happily leaves with his family.

Cast

Soundtrack

Don Seenu's soundtrack is composed by Mani Sharma. The soundtrack album, which was released on 22 July at Taj Deccan Hotel in Hyderabad, Noted director Dasari Narayana Rao released the first audio CD, whereas movie mughal D. Ramanaidu released the audio cassette. It features 6 songs, with one being a remix.

Production and release
Trisha was signed as the lead but she was replaced by Shriya Saran later, which marks her return to Telugu cinema after five years. Hindi film actress Anjana Sukhani was signed also signed as a lead. The film was released on 6 August 2010 in India and ran for over 50 days in theatres. The film recorded as Super hit at the box office.

Critical response
A reviewer for Indiaglitz called the screenplay an "eyesore", noting an imbalance in pacing between the first and second halves. Praise was directed at Ravi Teja's performance as well as the abundance of humour throughout the film.

References

External links

2010s Telugu-language films
Telugu films remade in other languages
2010 action comedy films
2010 films
2010 masala films
Films scored by Mani Sharma
Indian action comedy films
2010 directorial debut films
Films directed by Gopichand Malineni
2010 comedy films